Dart Buses was an independent bus operator in the Paisley and Renfrewshire area in the 1990s. The company is attributed with starting a bus war with the main operator of the area, Clydeside Scottish. Bus wars were common following bus deregulation, and the Paisley area was no stranger to fierce competition; however Dart Buses predominantly operated along routes of large operators and were more successful and subsequently grew much larger than other independents. The company collapsed in 2001.

History
The company started operating second-hand minibuses on local routes around Paisley, however these minibuses were soon displaced by larger single deck Leyland Nationals, around which the fleet was based. The company started to expand, and in particular grew a strong presence in the Gryffe area around Johnstone, Bridge of Weir, and Kilmacolm operating the lucrative motorway express buses to Glasgow in competition with Clydeside Scottish. Fierce competition ensued, including heavily discounted fares and network tickets from Clydeside. Clydeside also introduced its own low cost minibus service F&L around Paisley, in order to secure a larger share of the market from Dart.

In the late 1990s Clydeside was purchased by the Cowie Group, who rebranded the operation Arriva Scotland West. Arriva and Dart, both realising competition was uneconomic and couldn't last, reached an agreement and Arriva bought a 25% stake in Dart. This resulted in Dart and Arriva scaling back competition, Dart focusing on the Gryffe area services and motorway express buses, whilst Arriva pulled out of the area and concentrated on local Paisley business, that in turn Dart had stopped operating in. Arriva also ceased operations of its F&L business.

Dart concentrated on fleet improvements and bought progressively newer vehicles and expanded its local buses providing links that Arriva didn't operate to places like Pollok. It also expanded its express buses to other towns such as Kilbarchan as well as competing for Strathclyde PTE (SPT) tenders to operate local buses in Glasgow and East Kilbride. A number of SPT contracts were won, mostly from First Glasgow, and several new buses were bought for these routes. A small number of school contracts were also taken on.

Stagecoach West Scotland bought Arriva's stake in the business in 2001 and Dart began operating some of Stagecoach's routes in Glasgow and Pollok, operating their buses on these services in Stagecoach livery. It was suggested that Stagecoach didn't want to compete with First Glasgow, the dominant operator in the area.

However, the company suddenly collapsed overnight in October 2001. There were no warnings to the imminent collapse, other than the vehicles had been filling up using pumps outside of its depot. In the aftermath, most services were non-operational that day although some local operators did step in to help. In a surprise move, First Glasgow took on Dart's drivers and registered their express buses, before Arriva or Stagecoach, and SPT tendered the other routes on an emergency basis that operators were unwilling to operate but were vital services. Most of the tenders were won by local companies, most notably Riverside Transport, who also took on several of the Gryffe local services.

See also
List of bus operators of the United Kingdom

References

Transport in Paisley, Renfrewshire
Transport in Glasgow
Former bus operators in Scotland